HNoMS Valkyrjen was a torpedo boat destroyer of the Royal Norwegian Navy, built at F. Schichau shipyard in Elbing, Germany. The funds for the ship had been raised by the women of Norway and the ship was named Valkyrien in their honour. She was also nicknamed Damernes krigsskib ("The Ladies Warship"). The ship had its first sea trial on 11 May 1896 and was swiftly approved. She was completed in Horten, Norway, and delivered to the minister of defence in Christiania (Oslo), on 17 May 1896. The ship was opened to the public for two days before sailing back to Horten.

Valkyrjen had a displacement of 415 tons. She had a crew complement of 59. Her armament included two 76 mm and four 37 mm guns in addition to two torpedo launchers.

In 1922 Valkyrien was stripped of all reusable materials, and then sold for scrap in 1923.

References

External links
RNoN article about the ship

1896 ships
Destroyers of the Royal Norwegian Navy
Ships built in Elbing
Ships built by Schichau